The Military Plaza (Plaza de Armas) in San Antonio, Texas dates back to the 18th century as a military and commercial center in San Antonio. It is the location of San Antonio City Hall and the Spanish Governor's Palace.

See also
Main and Military Plazas Historic District
Market Square (San Antonio)

References

Geography of San Antonio
Squares in the United States
Buildings and structures in San Antonio